Humbleton is a village and civil parish in the East Riding of Yorkshire, England, in an area known as Holderness.

Overview
The civil parish is formed by the villages of Humbleton and Flinton.

According to the 2011 UK census, Humbleton parish had a population of 208, a reduction of one on the 2001 UK census figure.

The parish church of St Peter is a Grade I listed building.

Humbleton has a cricket field.

In 1823 inhabitants in the village numbered 136. Occupations included three farmers, a shoemaker, a tailor, a carpenter and a blacksmith. A carrier operated between the village and Hull on Tuesdays and Fridays. There was a public school for poor parish children, the school teacher receiving a salary of 21 shillings. The parish is the birthplace of Admiral John Storr.

References

External links

Villages in the East Riding of Yorkshire
Holderness
Civil parishes in the East Riding of Yorkshire